Orienthella cooperi is a species of sea slug, an aeolid nudibranch, a marine gastropod mollusc in the family Flabellinidae.

Distribution
This species is known from the California Current region from Elkhorn Slough, California south to Bahia San Quintin, Baja California, Mexico.

Description

Orienthella cooperi has a translucent white body with a stripe of white surface pigment along the middle of the back. This line forks in front of the rhinophores and may continue onto the oral tentacles. There are small white pigment spots on the outer part of the oral tentacles and rhinophores. The cerata contain green digestive gland and have a sprinkling of white spots in the outer part, below the cnidosacs.

References

External links

Flabellinidae
Gastropods described in 1901